The John White House is a historic stone house built  and located on Cold Soil Road north of the Lawrenceville section of Lawrence Township in Mercer County, New Jersey. Featuring Federal architecture, the house was added to the National Register of Historic Places on January 29, 1973, for its significance in architecture.

See also
National Register of Historic Places listings in Mercer County, New Jersey

References

		
Lawrence Township, Mercer County, New Jersey
Stone houses in New Jersey
Federal architecture in New Jersey
National Register of Historic Places in Mercer County, New Jersey
Houses on the National Register of Historic Places in New Jersey
Houses in Mercer County, New Jersey
Houses completed in 1800
1800 establishments in New Jersey
New Jersey Register of Historic Places